Luiz Henrique Ferreira de Menezes (born 5 September 1943), known as just Luiz Henrique, is a Brazilian former footballer.

Luiz Henrique was a Brazilian former footballer. He played as midfielder when he was active. Currently, he lived in retirement house

References

1943 births
Living people
Brazilian footballers
Association football midfielders
Fluminense FC players
Pan American Games medalists in football
Pan American Games gold medalists for Brazil
Footballers at the 1963 Pan American Games
Medalists at the 1963 Pan American Games